Invisible Kid is a DC comic book superhero.

Invisible Kid may also refer to:
Invisible Kid (Jacques Foccart), successor to the DC comic book superhero
"Invisible Kid", a song by Metallica on the album St. Anger
The Invisible Kid, a 1988 film directed by Avery Crounse